Əhmədli is a village and municipality in the Dashkasan District of Azerbaijan.

References 

Populated places in Dashkasan District